Colin Fleming and Ken Skupski were the defending champions, but they lost to Henri Kontinen and Jarkko Nieminen in the final.
The Finnish pair reached the final, where they lost to 4th seeds Frederik Nielsen and Joseph Sirianni 5–7, 6–3, [2–10].

Seeds

Draw

Draw

References
 Doubles Draw

Caversham International Tennis Tournament - Doubles